Anatolie Onceanu (born April 14, 1951, Sîngerei city, Sîngerei District, Republic of Moldova)  is a Moldovan MP in the Parliament of the Republic of Moldova, elected in the Legislature 2005–2009 on the lists of the Electoral Bloc Democratic Moldova.

Education
1968 - 1975 - State University of Moldova, Faculty of History, specialty - history.

Professional activity
 2005 - 2009 - MP, Parliament of the Republic of Moldova,
 2003 - 2005 – Head of the fraction of the Our Moldova Alliance, in the Municipal Council of Chisinau
 1995 - 2003 - Deputy-Mayor, Chisinau City Hall
 1990 -1995 - Director, Pedagogical College "Alexei Mateevici" of Chișinău.
 1985 - 1990 - Instructor, Central Committee of the Communist Party of Moldova.
 1975 - 1985 - Head of Section, Rayon Committee of the Central Committee of the Leninist-Communist Youth Union of Moldova.
 1973 - 1975 – Methodist at the Institute for Continuous Training of Teachers of the Ministry of Education of Moldova.

References

External links 
 Parlamentul Republicii Moldova
 List of candidates to the position of deputy in the Parliament of the Republic of Moldova for parliamentary elections of 6 March, 2005 of the Electoral Bloc “Moldova Democrata”
 List of deputies elected in the March 6 parliamentary elections
 Lista deputaţilor aleşi la 6 martie 2005 în Parlamentul Republicii Moldova

1951 births
Living people
Moldovan MPs 2005–2009
Electoral Bloc Democratic Moldova MPs